Venkampally is a village in Kamareddy district in the state of Telangana in India.

Villages in Kamareddy district